Eligius (11 June 588 – 1 December 660) was a Frankish goldsmith and bishop. He was chief counsellor to Dagobert I, the Merovingian king of France, and was appointed Bishop of Noyon–Tournai three years after the king's death in 642.

Despite being from a wealthy Gallo-Roman family, Eligius became increasingly ascetic and known for caring for slaves and the poor. He worked for 20 years to convert the pagan population of Flanders to Christianity. His deeds were recorded in Vita Sancti Eligii, written by his friend Ouen of Rouen.

Eligius is best known for being the patron saint of horses and those who work with them. He is also the patron saint of goldsmiths, metalworkers, coin collectors, veterinarians and the Royal Electrical and Mechanical Engineers (REME), a corps of the British Army.

Biography
Eligius was born at the villa of Captelat, six miles north of Limoges, in Aquitaine (now France), into an educated and influential Gallo-Roman family. His father, recognising unusual talent in his son, sent him to the goldsmith Abbo, master of the mint at Limoges. Later Eligius went to Neustria, the palace of the Franks, where he worked under Babo, the royal treasurer, on whose recommendation Clotaire II, king of the Franks, is said to have commissioned him to make a throne of gold adorned with precious stones.

"And from that which he had taken for a single piece of work, he was able to make two. Incredibly, he could do it all from the same weight for he had accomplished the work commissioned from him without any fraud or mixture of siliquae, or any other fraudulence. Not claiming fragments bitten off by the file or using the devouring flame of the furnace for an excuse, but filling all faithfully with gems, he happily earned his happy reward."

Among other goldsmithing work soon entrusted to Eligius were the bas-reliefs for the tomb of Germain, Bishop of Paris. Clotaire took Eligius into the royal household and appointed him master of the mint at Marseilles.

After the death of Clotaire in 629, Dagobert appointed his father's friend his chief councillor. Eligius' reputation spread rapidly, to the extent that ambassadors first sought out Eligius for counsel and to pay their respects to him before going to the king. He made some enemies. His success in inducing the Breton prince, Judicael, to make a pact with Dagobert, at a meeting at the king's villa of Creil (636–37) increased his influence: "Indeed King Dagobert, swift, handsome and famous with no rival among any of the earlier kings of the Franks, loved him so much that he would often take himself out of the crowds of princes, optimates, dukes or bishops around him and seek private counsel from Eligius".

Eligius took advantage of this royal favor to obtain alms for the poor and to ransom captive Romans, Gauls, Bretons, Moors and especially Saxons, who were arriving daily at the slave market in Marseilles. His friend Ouen of Rouen recalled him with love in Vita Sancti Eligii:

"He was tall with a rosy face. He had a pretty head of hair with curly locks. His hands were honest and his fingers long. He had the face of an angel and a prudent look. At first, he was used to wear gold and gems on his clothes, having belts composed of gold and gems and elegantly jeweled purses, linens covered with red metal and golden sacs hemmed with gold and all of the most precious fabrics including all of silk. But all of this was but fleeting ostentation from the beginning and beneath he wore a hairshirt next to his flesh and, as he proceeded to perfection, he gave the ornaments for the needs of the poor. Then you would see him, whom you had once seen gleaming with the weight of the gold and gems that covered him, go covered in the vilest clothing with a rope for a belt."

Besides Eligius's self-mortification, Ouen recalled his propensity for weeping, "For he had the great grace of tears."

Eligius founded several monasteries, and with the king's consent, sent his servants through towns and villages to take down the bodies of criminals who had been executed and give them decent burial. Eligius was a source of edification at court, where he and Ouen lived according to the strict Irish monastic rule that had been introduced into Gaul by Columbanus. Eligius introduced this rule, either entirely or in part, into the monastery of Solignac near Limoges, which he founded in 632 at a villa he had purchased, and also at the convent he founded at Paris, where three hundred virgins were under the guidance of the Abbess Aurea. He also built the basilica of St. Paul and restored the basilica at Paris that was devoted to Saint Martial, the patron bishop-saint of his native Limoges. Eligius also erected several fine tombs in honor of the relics of Martin of Tours, the national saint of the Franks, and Denis, who was chosen patron saint by the king.

On the death of Dagobert in 639, Queen Nanthild took the reins of government, the king Clovis II being a child. During this regency, Eligius launched a campaign against simony in the church. On the death of Acarius, Bishop of Noyon–Tournai, 14 March of Clovis's third year (642), Eligius was made his successor, with the unanimous approbation of clergy and people. "So the unwilling goldsmith was tonsured and constituted guardian of the towns or municipalities of Vermandois which include the metropolis, Tournai, which was once a royal city, and Noyon and Ghent and Kortrijk of Flanders."

The inhabitants of his new diocese were pagans for the most part. He undertook the conversion of the Flemings, Frisians, Suevi, and the other Germanic tribes along the North Sea coast. He made frequent missionary excursions and also founded a great many monasteries and churches. In his own episcopal city of Noyon he built and endowed a nunnery for virgins. After the finding of the body of Quentin of Amiens, Eligius erected in his honor a church to which was joined a monastery under the Irish rule. He also discovered the bodies of Piatus of Tournai and his martyred companions, and in 654 removed the remains of Fursey, the celebrated Irish missionary (died 650).

Eligius died on 1 December 660 and was buried at Noyon.

Several writings of Eligius have survived: a sermon in which he combats the pagan practices of his time, a homily on the Last Judgment and a letter written in 645 in which he begs for the prayers of Bishop Desiderius of Cahors. There are fourteen other pseudepigraphical homilies that are no longer attributed to him.

An important study about the work of Eligius as a goldsmith was contributed by the German scholar Hayo Vierck to the Joachim Werner Festschrift in 1974.

Legend of the shoeing of the horse 
There is also a legend that Eligius resolved the problem of a horse reluctant to be shod.  He thought it was possessed by demons, so he cut off the horse's foreleg and, while the horse stood on the remaining three legs and watched, he re-shod the hoof on the amputated leg, before miraculously re-attaching the leg to the horse.

The legend is depicted in a pre-Reformation carving in the Wincanton Parish Church, Slapton Church Northamptonshire, England, a tapestry in the Hospices de Beaune (Hotel Dieu) in Beaune, France, as a fresco on the wall of Aarhus Cathedral, Denmark, as well as in a 14th-century painting attributed to Niccolo di Pietro Gerini in the Petit Palais in Avignon, France. The painting was confiscated from an Austrian collector by the Germans during World War II and was restituted to the heirs of the original owners in March 2013 by the French Ministry of Culture.

Veneration

Eligius is particularly honored in Flanders, in the province of Antwerp, and at Tournai, Kortrijk, Ghent, Bruges, and Douai. During the Middle Ages his relics were the object of special veneration, and were repeatedly divided and transferred to other resting-places, in 881, 1066, 1137, 1255, and 1306. A good deal of legend has gathered round the life of Eligius, who is still very popular with goldsmiths, farriers and car mechanics.

Patronage 
Eligius is the patron saint of horses and cattle and is also the patron saint of goldsmiths, blacksmiths, metalworkers in general and the British Army corps of Royal Electrical and Mechanical Engineers (REME).

An annual mass is celebrated around 9 December at Notre Dame de Paris for members of the Confraternity of Saint Éloi.  This follows the tradition of the May offering, usually a religious painting, made to the Cathedral between 1630 and 1707 by the goldsmiths of Paris. The tradition of the Guild Chapel was revived in 1953 by the Paris goldsmiths who provided the altar, crucifix above it and a statue of Eligius.

Iconography
Eligius is invariably depicted in bishop's garb, holding his emblem, a goldsmith's hammer. The only exceptions are the illustrations to Vita Sancti Eligii that depict episodes before his investiture as bishop. He is generally represented as a bishop, a crosier in his right hand, holding a miniature church of chased gold on the open palm of his left hand.

The Petrus Christus panel of 1449 illustrating this article, since the removal of its overpainted halo in 1993, is now recognised in the Lehman Collection at the Metropolitan Museum of Art as the Vocational Portrait of a Goldsmith, and not as a depiction of Eligius.

Notes

See also

 St Andrews Church, Hempstead, a church in England where a panel depicting Eligius has been stolen
 St. Elsewhere, an American medical drama set in the fictional "St. Eligius Hospital"
 Le bon roi Dagobert, a French nursery rhyme about Eligius and King Dagobert I
 Saint Eligius, patron saint archive

References

External links

Vita Sancti Eligii, written by his friend, housemate and companion Saint Ouen of Rouen, who was high among the optimates at the Frankish court ( Jo Ann McNamara)
 The Life of St. Loye, as featured in the Golden Legend and written by William Caxton
 Patron Saints Index: Saint Eligius
 Saint Eligius at the Christian Iconography web site
 Light in the dark places, Chapter on Saint Eligius, Prof. Augustus Neander, 1851.

588 births
660 deaths
7th-century Gallo-Roman people
7th-century Frankish bishops
7th-century Frankish saints
Bishops of Tournai
People from Haute-Vienne
7th-century Frankish writers
7th-century Latin writers
History of Flanders